Al-Taraf Club  is a Saudi Arabian Association football team in Al-Ahsa City playing at the Saudi Fourth Division.

Notable players
Saad Al Thyab

References

Taraf
1980 establishments in Saudi Arabia
Association football clubs established in 1980